Venatiolaspis is a genus of mites in the family Macrochelidae.

References

Macrochelidae
Articles created by Qbugbot